"Evanescent" is the third single by Vamps, released on May 13, 2009. It includes a cover of the 1973 song "Life on Mars?" by David Bowie. The bass on the title track is provided by K.A.Z's former hide with Spread Beaver bandmate Chirolyn. The limited edition came with a DVD including the music video for the title track and its making of. The single reached number 4 on the Oricon chart.

Track listing

References 

2009 singles
Japanese rock songs
Songs written by Hyde (musician)
2009 songs